is a Japanese swimmer. He competed in the 4 × 200 metre freestyle relay event at the 2012 Summer Olympics.

References

External links

1991 births
Living people
Olympic swimmers of Japan
Swimmers at the 2012 Summer Olympics
Japanese male freestyle swimmers
Place of birth missing (living people)
20th-century Japanese people
21st-century Japanese people